Blackwater River State Park is a Florida State Park located fifteen miles northeast of Milton, near Harold, off U.S. 90. The address is 7720 Deaton Bridge Road.

History
The park was certified a Registered State Natural Feature in 1980, for possessing exceptional value in illustrating the natural history of Florida. In 1982, an Atlantic white cedar there was recognized as a Florida Champion tree, one of the largest and oldest of its species.

Recreational activities
The park has such amenities as birding, boating, canoeing, fishing, hiking, kayaking, picnicking areas, swimming, tubing, wildlife viewing and full camping facilities.  The main picnicking area has covered picnicking pavilions, restrooms, and a parking lot.

See also
Blackwater River State Forest

References

External links

 Blackwater River State Park at Florida State Parks
 Blackwater River State Park at State Parks

Parks in Santa Rosa County, Florida
State parks of Florida